Luciane Dambacher (born 10 May 1976) is a retired Brazilian athlete who specialised in the high jump. She won the silver medal at the 1999 Pan American Games in Winnipeg. In addition, she won many medals on continental level.

Her personal best in the event is 1.88 metres, first set in 1999.

Competition record

References

1976 births
Living people
Athletes (track and field) at the 1999 Pan American Games
Athletes (track and field) at the 2003 Pan American Games
Brazilian female high jumpers
Pan American Games medalists in athletics (track and field)
Pan American Games silver medalists for Brazil
Medalists at the 1999 Pan American Games
21st-century Brazilian women